Ricardo Fargas Roger (born 24 May 1973), known as Ricky, is a Spanish former footballer.

Ricky played four seasons in the Segunda División for Castellón, Villarreal and Leganés. In August 1998 he joined the Finnish top division Veikkausliiga club FC Jazz. Ricky was the first Spanish player in Finnish football series. He later returned to Spain where he played for several years in the lower divisions.

References 

 Jugadora de la Gramas en Segunda B (in Spanish)

1973 births
Footballers from Manresa
Spanish footballers
Association football forwards
Segunda División players
Segunda División B players
Tercera División players
Veikkausliiga players
Villarreal CF players
CD Castellón footballers
CD Leganés players
FC Jazz players
Palamós CF footballers
Living people
UE Vilassar de Mar players
Spanish expatriate footballers
Expatriate footballers in Finland